Saint Mark's High School is a coeducational Roman Catholic high school located at 2501 Pike Creek Road, in unincorporated New Castle County, Delaware, with a Wilmington postal address. The school is administrated by the Roman Catholic Diocese of Wilmington. It is accredited by the Middle States Association of Colleges and Schools.

Notable alumni

 Nicole Bosso, former Miss Delaware USA
 John Carney, Governor of Delaware (2017–present), former U.S. Representative from Delaware (2011-2017) and former Lieutenant Governor of Delaware (2001–2009)
 Louis Carlet, union organizer
 Tom Douglas, Seattle chef and restaurateur
 Kevin Mench, retired Major League Baseball player.
 Mario Pino, horse racing jockey
 David Plouffe, campaign manager for Barack Obama
 Keith Powell, television actor
 Pedro Swann, former MLB player
 Steve Watson, NFL wide receiver

References

External links 
 

High schools in New Castle County, Delaware
Catholic secondary schools in Delaware
Educational institutions established in 1969
1969 establishments in Delaware
Roman Catholic Diocese of Wilmington